Tampines Mall is a suburban shopping mall located at Tampines Central 5 in Tampines, Singapore, next to Century Square as well as Tampines 1. It was completed in 1995.

History
Completed in November 1995, Tampines Mall was developed by DBS Land (the predecessor of Capitaland) and NTUC Fairprice Co-Operative. It was officially opened by then Minister for Communications Mr Mah Bow Tan in February 1996. Like suburban malls completed at that time, it had various anchor tenants, such as an Isetan department store, a Golden Village cineplex, a Kopitam food court, an NTUC Fairprice supermarket, a Popular bookstore, Toys 'R' Us and more than 100 specialty shops. It was the one of the largest suburban malls in Singapore back then.
The mall was refurbished in 2004, comprising the installation of a large screen at the roof terrace, and the addition of water features to provide a cooling environment.

The mall underwent its second refurbishment in 2014, this time converting the roof level into an education hub, and giving a facade a new appearance. The food court, cinema and Basement 1 shops were renovated as well.

See also
 Century Square
 Tampines 1
 Eastpoint Mall
 White Sands

References

External links
 
 Tampines Town Council

CapitaLand
Shopping malls in Singapore
Tampines